Petra Jebram (born 23 March 1954) is a German gymnast. She competed in six events at the 1968 Summer Olympics.

References

1954 births
Living people
German female artistic gymnasts
Olympic gymnasts of West Germany
Gymnasts at the 1968 Summer Olympics
Sportspeople from Bochum